St. Olaf is a city in Clayton County, Iowa, United States. The population was 106 at the time of the 2020 census, down from 136 in 2000. Swiss Valley has a large cheese packaging plant in St. Olaf.

History
St. Olaf was founded in 1872 and was incorporated as a town in 1900.

Geography
St. Olaf is located at  (42.927724, −91.387236).

Demographics

2010 census
As of the census of 2010, there were 108 people, 43 households, and 34 families living in the city. The racial makeup of the city was 100.0% White.

There were 43 households, of which 27.9% had children under the age of 18 living with them, 67.4% were married couples living together, 11.6% had a female householder with no husband present, and 20.9% were non-families. 18.6% of all households were made up of individuals, and 9.3% had someone living alone who was 65 years of age or older. The average household size was 2.51 and the average family size was 2.85.

The median age in the city was 41 years. 25% of residents were under the age of 18; 7.5% were between the ages of 18 and 24; 22.2% were from 25 to 44; 27.8% were from 45 to 64; and 17.6% were 65 years of age or older. The gender makeup of the city was 47.2% male and 52.8% female.

2000 census
As of the census of 2000, there were 136 people, 49 households, and 39 families living in the city. The racial makeup of the city was 100.00% White.

There were 49 households, out of which 46.9% had children under the age of 18 living with them, 63.3% were married couples living together, 8.2% had a female householder with no husband present, and 18.4% were non-families. 14.3% of all households were made up of individuals, and 14.3% had someone living alone who was 65 years of age or older. The average household size was 2.78 and the average family size was 2.85.

In the city, the population was spread out, with 33.8% under the age of 18, 5.9% from 18 to 24, 32.4% from 25 to 44, 18.4% from 45 to 64, and 9.6% who were 65 years of age or older. The median age was 33 years. For every 100 females, there were 88.9 males. For every 100 females age 18 and over, there were 83.7 males.

The median income for a household in the city was $34,583, and the median income for a family was $36,250. Males had a median income of $26,250 versus $17,500 for females. The per capita income for the city was $15,284. There were 2.5% of families and 8.1% of the population living below the poverty line, including 5.4% of under eighteens and 36.4% of those over 64.

Education
The municipality is within the boundary of the Central Community School District.

References

Cities in Clayton County, Iowa
Cities in Iowa
1872 establishments in Iowa
Populated places established in 1872